Ng Jui Ping (17 October 1948 – 1 January 2020) was a Singaporean lieutenant-general who served as Chief of Defence Force between 1992 and 1995.

Education

Ng held a Master of Arts in history from Duke University. He attended the six-week Advanced Management Program at Harvard Business School.

Military career
Ng's career in the Singapore Armed Forces (SAF) spanned 30 years. He served as Assistant Chief of the General Staff (Personnel), Commander of 3rd Division, and Chief of Army between 1990 and 1992, and later as Chief of Defence Force between 1992 and 1995. Ng retired from the SAF in 1995.

Entrepreneurial career

After leaving the military, Ng took up an entrepreneurial route. He co-founded Pacific Andes Resources Development Ltd and held non-executive positions within the company from 27 January 2006. He was last re-elected as a director in the company on 22 January 2010. Ng also held non-executive or board positions in various other investment and business consulting companies, including: Oppenheimer Investments Ltd, Yanlord Land Group Ltd, Singapore Shipping Corporation Ltd, Port of Singapore Authority International (PSAI), Unisteel Technology Ltd and Global Voice Group Ltd. He leads August Asia Consulting (a consulting business) and Nanyang Institute of Management (a learning institute). He was also an advisor to various business groups, including: Aldar, Chesterton International Property Consultants Pte Ltd, AGT International, Swiss Asia Banking School AG and MEC Coal Pte Ltd.

Between 1995 and 2003, Ng held various positions, including: deputy chairman of the Central Provident Fund Board, Singapore; chairman of Chartered Industries of Singapore Pte Ltd; corporate advisor in Singapore Technologies Pte Ltd; corporate advisor in Singapore Technologies Engineering Ltd; chairman of Singapore Technologies Automotive Ltd; chairman of Ordnance Development & Engineering of Singapore (1996) Pte Ltd.

Ng was also the vice-president of the Football Association of Singapore.

Death
Ng died on 1 January 2020 at age 71 from pancreatic cancer.

Awards

 Public Administration Medal (Gold), in 1991.
 Meritorious Service Medal (Military), in 1995.

References

|-

|-
|-
 

|-

1948 births
2020 deaths
20th-century Singaporean businesspeople
21st-century Singaporean businesspeople
Chiefs of Defence Force (Singapore)
Chiefs of the Singapore Army
Deaths from pancreatic cancer
Singaporean people of Chinese descent
Duke University alumni
Recipients of the Pingat Pentadbiran Awam